Inagawa Circuit is a 0.64mile (1.030 km) motor racing circuit in 72-1 Maetani, Shimizu aza, Inagawa, Kawabe District, Hyōgo Prefecture 666-0214, West Japan.

References

External links 
Inagawa Circuit Official site (Japanese)

Motorsport venues in Japan
Sports venues in Hyōgo Prefecture